Košarkaški klub Škrljevo or simply Škrljevo, also known as DepoLink Škrljevo due to sponsorship reasons, is a men's professional basketball club based in the village of Škrljevo, Croatia, but plays its games in nearby municipality of Čavle.

Players

Current roster

References

External links
 

Basketball teams in Croatia
Basketball teams established in 1973
Basketball teams in Yugoslavia
1973 establishments in Croatia